I.W. Publications (also known as Super Comics) was a short-lived comic book publisher in the late 1950s and early 1960s. The company was part of I.W. Enterprises, and named for the company's owner, Israel Waldman. I.W. Publications was notable for publishing unauthorized reprints of other publishers' properties. Usually these companies were already out of business — but not always.

I.W. Publications published comics in a wide variety of genres, including crime, science fiction, Western, horror, war and romance comics, as well as cartoon animal and superhero titles. The company was known for its low-budget products: most of I.W.'s comics were sold in grocery and discount stores, often in "three comics for a quarter" plastic bags. The numbering of most of the company's titles is misleading, often not starting at issue #1 and skipping issue numbers. Incredibly, the company produced 118 separate titles, but only 332 individual issues — many titles only published a single issue.

The company published one comic book with original material: Marty Mouse #1 (1958), featuring talking animal stories by Vincent Fago, among others.

Some I.W./Super Comics titles used original cover art: illustrators included Jack Abel, Ross Andru, Sol Brodsky, Carl Burgos, Mike Esposito, and John Severin, with lettering by Ben Oda.

History 
Following the publication of Fredric Wertham's Seduction of the Innocent and the 1954 comic book hearings of the United States Senate Subcommittee on Juvenile Delinquency, many comic book publishers closed down shop in the years 1954–1956. Other than I.W., no new publishers debuted in 1958. Comics historian Don Markstein explained the company's methods:

The company started publishing in 1958, with comics originally published by Avon Comics, Fiction House, Magazine Enterprises, and others. Many of these comics had the tagline "A Top Quality Comics." After releasing a great quantity of comics in 1958, the company went on hiatus until 1963, when it again released a number of comics up into 1964. The latter half of the company's existence, it published comics under the Super Comics name. Many of these titles were reprints of Toby Press, Avon, Magazine Enterprises, and Quality Comics. Many of these titles had the tagline "Super Comics Seal of Quality."

I.W. Publications went out of business in 1964. Waldman would later be involved with the short-lived black-and-white comics magazines publisher Skywald Publications in the 1970s.

Publishers whose work was reprinted in I.W. Publications comics 

 Ace Comics (defunct, 1956)
 Avon Comics (defunct, 1956)
 Baily Publishing Company (defunct, 1946)
 Cambridge House Publishers (defunct, 1945)
 Chesler / Dynamic (defunct, 1946)
 Comic Media (defunct, 1954)
 Decker (defunct, 1957)
 EC Comics (defunct as comics publisher, 1956)
 Farrell Publications / Four Star Publications (defunct, 1958)
 Fiction House (defunct, 1955)
 Fox Feature Syndicate  (defunct, 1950)
 Green Publishing (defunct, 1957)
 Iger Studios (defunct, 1955)
 Key Publications (defunct, 1956)
 Kiddie Kapers Company (defunct, 1945)
 Magazine Enterprises (defunct, 1958)
 Mainline Publications (defunct, 1956)
 Master Comics (defunct, 1955)
 Medal Comics / Timor Publications (Stanley Morse) (defunct, 1956)
 Nesbit (defunct, 1955)
 Novack Publishing (defunct, 1945)
 Novelty/Premium/Curtis (defunct, 1949)
 Prize Comics
 Quality Comics (defunct, 1956)
 Reston Publications (defunct, 1955)
 Spark Publications (defunct, 1946)
 St. John Publications (defunct, 1958)
 Stanhall Publishing (defunct, 1954)
 Star Publications (defunct, 1954)
 Superior Publishers Limited (defunct, 1956)
 Timely Comics / Atlas Comics / Marvel Comics
 Toby Press (defunct, 1955)
 Youthful (defunct, 1954)
 Ziff-Davis Comics (defunct, 1953)

Titles

{|class="wikitable mw-datatable sortable" 
! scope="col" background: #efefef;" style="width: 15%" | Title
! scope="col" background: #efefef;" style="width: 15%" | Pub. dates
! scope="col" background: #efefef;" style="width: 5%" | # of Issues
! scope="col" background: #efefef;" style="width: 20%" | Original publisher
! scope="col" background: #efefef;" style="width: 15%" | Original title
! scope="col" background: #efefef;" style="width: 10%" | Genre
! scope="col" background: #efefef;" style="width: 20%" | Notes
|-
| Algie || 1964 || 1 || Timor || Algie || teen humor ||
|-
| Apache || 1958 || 1 || Fiction House || Apache || Western ||
|-
| The Avenger || 1958 || 1 || Magazine Enterprises || The Avenger || superhero ||
|-
| Battle Stories || 1963–1964 || 7  || Avon, Farrell, Magazine Enterprises, Superior, Toby || various || war ||
|-
| Billy and Buggy Bear || 1958, 1963–1964 || 3 || Timely || All Surprise Comics || talking animal ||
|-
| Black Knight || 1963 || 1 || Toby || The Black Knight || adventure ||
|-
| Blazing Sixguns || 1958 || 10 || Fox, Key Publications, Mainline, Timor, Youthful || various || Western ||
|-
| The Brain || 1958, 1963 || 9  || Magazine Enterprises || The Brain || humor ||
|-
| Buccaneer / The Buccaneers || 1958, 1963–1964 || 3 || Quality || The Buccaneers || adventure ||
|-
| Buster Bear || 1958 || 2 || Novelty || Frisky Fables || talking animal || originally published in 1947
|-
| Candy || 1963–1964 || 3 || Quality || Candy || teen humor ||
|-
| Casper Cat || 1958, 1963 || 3 || Timely || Dopey Duck || talking animal || originally published in 1946
|-
| Cosmo Cat || 1958 || 1 || Fox || Cosmo Cat || talking animal ||
|-
| Cowboys 'N' Injuns || 1958, 1963 || 3 || Magazine Enterprises || Tick Tock Tales || humor || originally published in 1951
|-
| Danger || 1963–1964 || 7  || Dynamic Publications, Novack, Novelty, Timely, Toby || various || omnibus || includes a Nemo in Adventureland story by Bob McCay called "Morpheus's War" 
|-
| Danger is Our Business || 1958 || 1 || Toby || Danger is Our Business || crime ||
|-
| Daring Adventures || 1963–1964 || 9 || Avon, Fox, Star, Novelty, Spark, Superior || various || horror-suspense ||Issue 18# To Be adapted in the upcoming film Atlas: The Animated Movie
|-
| Dogface Dooley || 1958 || 2 || Magazine Enterprises || Dogface Dooley || military humor ||
|-
| Doll Man || 1963–1964 || 3 || Quality || Doll Man || superhero ||
|-
| Dr. Fu Manchu || 1958 || 1 || Avon || The Mask of Dr. Fu Manchu || adventure ||
|-
| Dream of Love || 1958 || 4 || Magazine Enterprises, Toby || various || romance ||
|-
| Dynamic Adventures || 1958 || 2 || Fiction House, Avon || various || omnibus ||
|-
| Dynamic Comics || 1958 || 1 || Superior || Dynamic Comics || omnibus ||
|-
| Eerie / Eerie Tales || 1958, 1963–1964 || 7 || Avon, Bernard Baily, Fiction House, Novelty, Star, Toby || various || horror-suspense ||
|-
| Famous Funnies || 1963–1964 || 3 || Avon, Farrell, Novelty, St. John || various || talking animal ||
|-
| Fantastic Adventures || 1963–1964 || 7 || Chesler, Farrell, Iger, Nesbit, Star, Toby || various || omnibus ||
|-
| Fantastic Tales || 1958 || 1 || Avon || City of the Living Dead || horror-suspense ||
|-
| Fighting Daniel Boone || 1958 || 1 || Avon || Fighting Daniel Boone || omnibus ||
|-
| Firehair || 1958 || 1 || Fiction House || Firehair || Western ||
|-
| Foxhole || 1963–1964 || 6 || Magazine Enterprises, Mainline, Toby || various || war ||
|-
| Frontier Romances || 1958 || 2 || Avon, Fiction House || various || Western romance || 
|-
| Full of Fun || 1958 || 1 || Bernard Baily || various || humor ||
|-
| Great Action Comics || 1958 || 3 || Cambridge House, Fox || Golden Medal Comics (Cambridge), Phantom Lady (Fox) || superhero ||
|-
| Great Western || 1958 || 4 || Magazine Enterprises || various || Western || includes a large quantity of Straight Arrow stories
|-
| Gunfighters || 1963–1964 || 5 || Farrell, Magazine Enterprises, Toby || various || Western ||
|-
| Hollywood Secrets of Romance || 1958 || 1 || Quality || Hollywood Secrets || romance ||
|-
| Human Fly || 1958 || 2 || Fox || Blue Beetle || superhero ||
|-
| Indian Braves || 1958 || 1 || Ace || Indian Braves || Western ||
|-
| Indians of the Wild West || 1958 || 1 || Fiction House || Indians || Western ||
|-
| Intimate Confessions || 1958, 1963–1964 || 4 || Avon || Intimate Confessions || romance ||
|-
| Jet Power || 1958 || 2 || Magazine Enterprises || Jet Power || science fiction ||
|-
| Jungle Adventures || 1963–1964 || 5 || Avon, Fiction House, Fox, Novelty, Star || various || jungle adventure ||
|-
| Jungle Comics || 1958 || 1 || Fiction House || Jungle Comics || jungle adventure ||
|-
| Ka'a'nga || 1958 || 2  || Fiction House || Ka'a'nga || jungle adventure ||
|-
| Kat Karson || 1958 || 1 || Magazine Enterprises || Cowboys 'N' Injuns || Western humor ||
|-
| Kid Koko || 1958 || 2 || Magazine Enterprises || Koko and Kola || talking animal ||
|-
| Kiddie Kapers || 1963 || 4 || Magazine Enterprises, Timor || Cowboys 'N' Injuns (Magazine Enterprises), Animal Adventures (Timor) || talking animal ||
|-
| Kit Carson || 1963 || 1 || Avon || Kit Carson || Western ||
|-
| Krazy Krow || 1958, 1963 || 3 || Timely || Krazy Krow || talking animal ||
|-
| Leo the Lion || 1958 || 1 || Green Publishing || Adventures of Patoruzu || talking animal ||
|-
| Little Eva || 1958, 1963–1964 || 14 || St. John || Little Eva || humor ||
|-
| Little Spunky || 1958 || 1 || Novelty || Frisky Fables || talking animal ||
|-
| Love and Marriage || 1958, 1963–1964 || 7 || Quality, Superior || various || romance || 
|-
| Malu in the Land of Adventure || 1958 || 1 || Avon || Slave Girl Comics || adventure ||
|-
| Man o' Mars || 1958 || 1 || Fiction House || various || science fiction ||
|-
| Marmaduke Monk || 1958, 1963 || 2 || Ace || Monkeyshines Comics || talking animal ||
|-
| Marty Mouse || 1958 || 1 || N/A || N/A || talking animal || not a reprint; apparently original material from Vincent Fago, among others
|-
| Master Detective || 1964 || 1 || Novelty || Criminals on the Run || crime ||
|-
| Meet Merton || 1958, 1963 || 3 || Toby || Meet Merton || teen humor ||
|-
| Mighty Atom || 1958 || 1  || Magazine Enterprises || Mighty Atom and the Pixies || fantasy ||
|-
| Muggsy Mouse || 1958, 1963 || 3 || Magazine Enterprises || Muggsy Mouse || talking animal ||
|-
| Muggy-Doo, Boy Cat || 1963–1964 || 2 || Stanhall || Muggy-Doo, Boy Cat || talking animal ||
|-
| My Secret Marriage || 1958 || 1 || Superior || My Secret Marriage || romance ||
|-
| Mystery Tales || 1964 || 3 || Avon, St. John, Toby || various || horror-suspense ||
|-
| Pee-Wee Pixies || 1958, 1963 || 3 || Magazine Enterprises || Pee-Wee Pixies || fantasy ||
|-
| Pinky the Egghead || 1958, 1963 || 3 || Comic Media || Pinky the Egghead || humor ||
|-
| Planet Comics || 1958 || 2 || Fiction House || Planet Comics || science fiction || 
|-
| Plastic Man || 1963 || 3 || Quality || Plastic Man || superhero ||
|-
| Police Trap || 1963–1964 || 4 || Mainline || Police Trap || crime ||
|-
| Purple Claw || 1958 || 1 || Toby || Purple Claw || horror-suspense ||
|-
| Realistic Romances || 1958 || 3 || Avon || Realistic Romances || romance ||
|-
| Red Mask || 1958 || 3 || Magazine Enterprises || Red Mask || Western ||
|-
| Robin Hood || 1958, 1963–1964 || 5 || Magazine Enterprises || Robin Hood || adventure ||
|-
| Romantic Love || 1958, 1963 || 5 || Avon, Toby || Romantic Love (Avon), Great Lover Romances & Young Lover Romances (Toby) || romance ||
|-
| Sensational Police Cases || 1958 || 1 || Avon || Prison Break || crime ||
|-
| Sharpy Fox || 1958, 1963 || 3 || Green Publishing, Kiddie Kapers Company, Timely || various || talking animal ||
|-
| Sheena, Queen of the Jungle || 1958 || 1 || Fiction House || Sheena, Queen of the Jungle || jungle adventure ||
|-
| Silver Kid Western || 1958 || 2 || Key Publications / Medal Comics || Silver Kid Western || Western || 
|-
| Space Comics || 1958 || 1 || Avon || Space Comics || science fiction ||
|-
| Space Detective || 1958 || 2 || Avon || Space Detective || science fiction ||
|-
| Space Mysteries || 1958 || 2 || Atlas, Fiction House || Journey into Unknown Worlds (Atlas), Planet Comics (Fiction House) || science fiction ||
|-
| Speedy Rabbit || 1958, 1963 || 3 || Key Publications || Peter Cottontail || talking animal ||
|-
| The Spirit || 1963–1964 || 2 || Quality || The Spirit || superhero || itself reprints of material from The Spirit section
|-
| Star Feature Comics || 1958 || 1 || Quality || Feature Comics || crime ||
|-
| Strange Mysteries || 1958, 1963–1964 || 8 || Avon, Chesler/Dynamic, Farrell, Four Star, Fox, Master Comics, Star, Toby || various || horror-suspense ||
|-
| Strange Planets || 1958 || 8 || Atlas, Avon, EC, Novelty, St. John || various || science fiction ||
|-
| Strange Worlds || 1958 || 1 || Avon || Strange Worlds || science fiction ||
|-
| Sunny, America's Sweetheart || 1958 || 1  || Fox || Sunny, America's Sweetheart || teen humor ||
|-
| Super-Brat || 1958 || 6 || Toby || Super-Brat || humor ||
|-
| Super Rabbit || 1958 || 3 || Timely || Super Rabbit || superhero talking animal || one issue does not contain any Super Rabbit stories on the inside
|-
| Teen Romances || 1963–1964 || 5 || Star || Popular Teen-Agers || romance ||
|-
| Teen-Age Talk || 1958 || 3 || Key Publications, Superior, Stanhall || various || teen humor ||
|-
| Tell It To the Marines || 1958, 1963–1964 || 3 || Toby || various || war ||
|-
| Three Rascals || 1958 || 3  || Magazine Enterprises || Clubhouse Rascals || humor ||
|-
| Tippy Terry || 1963 || 2 || Reston || Little Groucho || humor ||
|-
| Tom-Tom The Jungle Boy || 1958, 1963 || 4 || Magazine Enterprises || Tick Tock Tales || talking animal ||
|-
| Top Adventure Comics || 1958 || 2 || Decker, Superior, Ziff-Davis || various || adventure ||
|-
| Top Detective Comics || 1958 || 1 || Novelty || Criminals on the Run || crime ||
|-
| Top Jungle Comics || 1958 || 1 || Avon || White Princess of the Jungle || jungle adventure ||
|-
| Torchy || 1964 || 1 || Quality || Torchy || humor ||
|-
| Tuffy Turtle || 1958 || 1 || Green Publishing || Ribtickler || talking animal ||
|-
| U.S. Fighting Air Force || 1958 || 2 || Superior || U.S. Fighting Air Force || war ||
|-
| U.S. Fighting Men || 1963–1964 || 7 || Avon, Superior, Timely, Toby || various || war ||
|-
| U.S. Paratroops || 1958 || 2 || Avon || U.S. Paratroops || war ||
|-
| U.S. Tank Commandos || 1958 || 2 || Avon || U.S. Tank Commandos || war ||
|-
| Undersea Commandos || 1964 || 1 || Avon || Fighting Undersea Commandos || war ||
|-
| Wacky Duck || 1958, 1963 || 4 || Timely || Wacky Duck || talking animal ||
|-
| Wacky Woodpecker || 1958 || 2 || Toby || Two-Bit the Wacky Woodpecker || talking animal ||
|-
| Wambi || 1958 || 1 || Fiction House || Wambi, Jungle Boy || jungle adventure ||
|-
| Western Action || 1958 || 1 || Avon || Cow Puncher Comics || Western ||
|-
| Westerner || 1963–1963 || 3 || Farrell, Quality, Timor || various || Western ||
|-
| Whip Wilson || 1958 || 1 || Timely || Whip Wilson || Western ||
|-
| Wild Bill Hickok || 1958, 1963–1964 || 4 || Avon || various || Western ||
|-
| Wild Western Roundup || 1958 || 1  || Decker, Ziff-Davis ||  Wild Western Roundup (Decker), Kid Cowboy (Ziff-Davis) || Western ||
|-
| Young Hearts In Love || 1963 || 2 || Prize || Young Love || romance ||
|-
| Ziggy Pig || 1958 || 4 || Timely || Ziggy Pig || talking animal ||
|}

 Notes 

 References 

 
 Brennan, T. Casey. "The Untold History of I.W. Comics," The Comics Journal'' #57 (June 1980), pp. 118–119.

Comic book publishing companies of the United States
Defunct comics and manga publishing companies